A 3D video game (three-dimensional video game) may refer to:

a video game featuring 3D game graphics, which are computed in three directional dimensions
a stereoscopic video game with a stereoscopic depth effect

See also 
 List of stereoscopic video games
 List of 3D PlayStation 3 games
 List of games with Nvidia 3D Vision support
 List of Nintendo 3DS games